Uggdal is the administrative centre of Tysnes municipality in Vestland county, Norway. The village is located on the west side of the island of Tysnesøya.

Uggdal is the site of the municipal administration, a doctor's office, the local fire and police stations, as well as a school.  Uggdal Church is also located in the village, serving the parish of Uggdal which includes the southwestern part of the island of Tysnesøya.

References

Villages in Vestland
Tysnes